Bryobium retusum, commonly known as the Christmas Island urchin orchid, is an epiphytic clump-forming orchid that has oval, fleshy green pseudobulbs, each with two leaves and between seven and twelve short-lived, self-pollinating, pale green, hairy flowers.  This orchid is found between Java and New Caledonia.

Description
The flowers are self-pollinating, short-lived and hairy on the outside. Flowering occurs from September to November.

Taxonomy and naming
The Christmas Island urchin orchid was first formally described in 1825 by Carl Ludwig Blume who gave it the name Dendrolirium retusum and published the description in Bijdragen tot de flora van Nederlandsch Indië. In 2005 Yan Peng Ng and Phillip Cribb changed the name to Bryobium retusum. The specific epithet (retusum) is a Latin word meaning "blunted", "rounded" or "notched at the apex".

Distribution and habitat
Bryobium retusum grows near the top of rainforest trees. It is found in Borneo, Java, the Lesser Sunda Islands, New Guinea, the Solomon Islands, New Caledonia and the Australian territory of Christmas Island.

References

External links
 

retusum
Orchids of Australia
Orchids of Indonesia
Orchids of New Caledonia
Orchids of New Guinea
Plants described in 1825